Paul Henry Brown (born 10 September 1984) is an English footballer who plays as a midfielder. He currently plays for Workington.

Club career
Brown made his debut for Tranmere Rovers, coming on as a substitute in the 87th minute, at home to MK Dons, in the 2–0 victory in League One on 27 November 2004. He made a further two appearances in League Two during the 2004–05 season. The following season, 2005–06, he was sent out on loan to Accrington Stanley in September, and made three appearances in the Conference National.

He then joined Barrow in August 2006, before leaving March 2007. He then joined Australian club Kingston City, returning to Barrow in August 2007, helping them to achieve promotion from the Conference North via the play-offs in 2007–08. After one season in the Conference National he was released by Barrow.

Brown signed for Droylsden in the 2009–10 season following his release by Barrow. He left the club in September 2011.

In October 2012, Brown joined Workington.

International career
Byron played for England C in a 4–0 victory over the Malta under-21 team in February 2009.

References

External links

1984 births
Living people
Footballers from Liverpool
English footballers
England semi-pro international footballers
Association football midfielders
Tranmere Rovers F.C. players
Accrington Stanley F.C. players
Barrow A.F.C. players
Droylsden F.C. players
Witton Albion F.C. players
Vauxhall Motors F.C. players
Marine F.C. players
Workington A.F.C. players
English Football League players
National League (English football) players
Kingston City FC players